Since rugby has two codes, a comparison of American football and rugby may refer to either:
Comparison of American football and rugby union
Comparison of American football and rugby league